Valday is a town and the administrative center of Valdaysky District in Novgorod Oblast, Russia, located on the southwestern shore of Lake Valdayskoye, the biggest one in the set of lakes in the highest region of the Valdai Hills, on the M10 Highway connecting Moscow and St. Petersburg,  from Moscow and  from Veliky Novgorod, the administrative center of the oblast. Population:

History
It was first mentioned in a chronicle in 1495. At the time, it was a part of Derevskaya Pyatina of the Novgorod Republic. The growth of Valday was facilitated by construction of a road connecting Novgorod to Central Russia and by the foundation of the Valday Iversky Monastery in 1653, which became a major cultural center. The famous monastery, built under the auspices of Patriarch Nikon in the 1650s, is located on one of the islands of Lake Valdayskoye.

In the course of the administrative reform carried out in 1708 by Peter the Great, the territory was included into Ingermanland Governorate (known since 1710 as St. Petersburg Governorate). In 1727, separate Novgorod Governorate was split off. In 1770, Valday was chartered and became the seat of Valdaysky Uyezd of Novgorod Viceroyalty. In 1796, the viceroyalty was transformed into Novgorod Governorate. Located along the road connecting Moscow and St. Petersburg, Valday developed as a major trade center. The town became the leading center of bell manufacturing in Russia. It also became a major pilgrim destination.

In August 1927, the uyezds were abolished and, effective October 1, 1927, Valdaysky District was established, with the administrative center in Valday. Novgorod Governorate was abolished as well and the district became a part of Borovichi Okrug of Leningrad Oblast. On July 23, 1930, the okrugs were abolished and the districts were directly subordinated to the oblast. Valday was close to the eastern front line for Russia during World War II, but was never occupied by German troops. On July 5, 1944, Valdaysky District was transferred to newly established Novgorod Oblast and remained there ever since.

Administrative and municipal status
Within the framework of administrative divisions, Valday serves as the administrative center of Valdaysky District. As an administrative division, it is, together with the selo of Zimogorye, incorporated within Valdaysky District as the town of district significance of Valday. As a municipal division, the town of district significance of Valday is incorporated within Valdaysky Municipal District as Valdayskoye Urban Settlement.

Economy

Industry
In Valday, there are enterprises of timber and food industries, as well as enterprises producing optical devices and pumps.

Transportation
A railway which connects Bologoye and Pskov via Staraya Russa passes through Valday. The town also has a railway connection with Kresttsy. There is no passenger traffic but the railway is in use for cargo traffic.

Valday is located on the M10 Highway which connects Moscow and St. Petersburg. There is a road connection to Okulovka, as well as local roads.

Culture and tourism

Valday is a popular tourist destination, situated in the middle of the Valdaysky National Park, in the northern part of the Valdai Hills. Most tourists visit the lake and the town during the summer. Valday features many recreation facilities and sanatoria, with many camping places available around the lake. The first meeting of the Valdai Discussion Club was also held on the lake.

Valday contains forty-three cultural heritage monuments of federal significance and additionally seventy-four objects classified as cultural and historical heritage of local significance. The federal monuments are the ensemble of Valday Iversky Monastery, the Presentation Church, and a park.

The Valdaysky District Museum, located in Valday, displays two exhibitions. One is devoted to the history of Valday as an uyezd seat in the 19th century. This part of the museum is located in the Mikhaylova House, a 19th-century historical building. The second part, in the former Church of St. Catherine, highlights the history of Valday bell-making. In the end of the 18th and in the 19th century, bell-making was a traditional handicraft in Valday. Big church bells, as well as small bells which were hung to a horse harness, were produced.

Gallery

Residence of the President of Russia
Very close to the town on the coast of Lake Valdayskoye there is a residence of the President of Russia. The complex of buildings is highly secured and a large sector of the lake is closed for boats and swimmers. This place was frequented by President Boris Yeltsin and is also Vladimir Putin's favorite. Putin's Dacha is on the southern  of a peninsula between Lake Uzhin and Lake Valdai and is across Lake Valdai from Valday. Often, Putin's Dacha, which was built in 1980, is called Valdai, Dolgie Bearods, or Stalin's Dacha, but Stalin was not alive when Valdai was built. Abuting north of this location is  owned by the Russian Federation and is frequented by the Federal Security Service. According to Alexei Navalny, Yuri Kovalchuk is the owner of Putin's Dacha.

Twin towns – sister cities
 Cañon City, United States

References

Notes

Sources

External links

Official website of Valday 
Unofficial website of Valday 

Cities and towns in Novgorod Oblast
Valdaysky Uyezd